Helina Rüütel (born 11 August 1997) is an Estonian badminton player who joined the national team in 2013.

Career 
In 2015, she won bronze medal at the European Junior Championships in girls' doubles event with her partner Kristin Kuuba.

In 2019, she competed at the 2019 European Games, reaching the quarter finals in the women's doubles partnered with Kati-Kreet Marran.

Achievements

European Junior Championships 
Girls' doubles

BWF International Challenge/Series (13 titles, 6 runners-up) 
Women's singles

Women's doubles

Mixed doubles

  BWF International Challenge tournament
  BWF International Series tournament
  BWF Future Series tournament

References

External links 

 

1997 births
Living people
Sportspeople from Tartu
Estonian female badminton players
Badminton players at the 2015 European Games
Badminton players at the 2019 European Games
European Games competitors for Estonia
21st-century Estonian women